Aleix Espargaró Villà (born 30 July 1989) is a Spanish Grand Prix motorcycle road racer. He was the Spanish 2004 FIM CEV 125cc International Champion, and currently competes in the MotoGP class for Aprilia Racing team.

Career
Espargaró was born in Granollers, Spain.
Espargaró had his breakthrough in the  MotoGP season with Forward Yamaha finishing 7th in the championship with the highlight being a 2nd place finish in Aragon. This earned him a move to Factory Suzuki Team in 2015. In 2017 he switched to Aprilia Racing Team Gresini.

125cc International Championship
In 2004, he won the Spanish FIM CEV International Championship 125 cc class with one win, two podiums at Circuito del Jarama and 88 total points.

250cc World Championship
In 2006, Espargaró moved to the 250cc class of Grand Prix Motorcycle World Championship racing mid-season, from the 125cc class. After Sebastian Porto ended his career, Martin Cardenas replaced Porto, and Espargaró took Cardenas' spot.

MotoGP World Championship
For , Espargaró was offered a deal with the Italian Campetella Racing team but they withdrew, leaving him without a permanent ride, but had two substitute appearances at Assen and Sachsenring for the Balatonring Team. He also acted as a Moto2 development rider.

Pramac Racing (2009–2010)
On 19 August 2009, it was announced Espargaró would race for Pramac Racing in MotoGP in Indianapolis and Misano. He replaced Mika Kallio, who in turn replaced Casey Stoner at the Ducati works team.

On 6 October 2009, it was announced that Espargaró had signed an agreement with Pramac Ducati to race in the 2010 MotoGP Championship. He replaced Niccolò Canepa in the team. He also replaced the injured Canepa for the last two races of the 2009 season in Sepang and Valencia.

In 2010 he remained in the same team with Mika Kallio as his teammate. During the German GP Espargaró was involved in an incident with Álvaro Bautista and Randy de Puniet  where he sustained a fracture of the vertebra and a small cut on the knee. His best result was two eighth places at Italy and Australia. He ended the season in 14th place with 65 points.

Moto2 World Championship

Pons HP40 (2011)

In 2011 he moved to Moto2 with the Pons HP40 team, his teammate was Axel Pons. He got a podium in Catalunya and ended the season in 12th place with 76 points.

Return to MotoGP

Power Electronics Aspar (2012–2013)
Espargaro returned to the MotoGP class, his teammate was Randy De Puniet . His best result was an eighth place in Malaysia and ended the season in 12th place with 74 points, making him the highest-placed CRT rider for the 2012 Season.

In 2013 he remained on the same team. He obtained a best result of eighth place achieved at Italy, Catalonia, Netherlands and Germany and finished the season in 11th place with 93 points, once again the highest-placed CRT rider.

NGM Forward Racing (2014)

In 2014 he moved to the Forward Racing team riding a Yamaha Forward with CRT specifications 
His teammate was Colin Edwards. He scored his first podium in MotoGP finishing second at the Aragon GP. He ended the season in 7th place with 126 points, making him the best of the riders equipped with CRT bikes for the third time in a row. He recorded his first-ever pole position at the Dutch TT at Assen, coming in his 150th Grand Prix weekend.

Team Suzuki Ecstar (2015–2016)

In 2015, after dominating the Open Class – previously known as CRT – he signed for the Suzuki works team to ride their new GSX-RR from 2015. His teammate was Maverick Viñales. He managed to get the second pole position of his career at the Catalonian GP, making it Suzuki's first pole since 2007. He ended the season in eleventh place with 105 points.

In 2016 he remained in the same team, achieving fourth place in Japan as his best result and finishing the season in 11th place with 93 points.

Aprilia Racing Team Gresini (2017–2021)
In 2017 he switched to Aprilia Racing Team Gresini, his teammate was Sam Lowes. He got two sixth places as his best result at Qatar and Aragon, ending the season in 15th place with 62 points. He was forced to miss the Malaysian Grand Prix due to a fracture of his left arm in the previous Grand Prix.

In 2018 his teammate was Scott Redding. His best result was a sixth place in Aragon and ended the season in 17th place with 44 points. He was forced to miss the German Grand Prix due to a injury sustained in warm up.

In 2019 his teammate was Andrea Iannone. His best result was a seventh place in Aragon and he finished the season in 14th place with 63 points.

In 2020 he remained with Aprilia. His best result was an eighth place in Portugal, and he ended the season in 17th place, with 42 points.

For the 2021 season, Espargaró remained with Aprilia, and his teammate at the beginning of the season was Lorenzo Savadori. The Aprilia bike immediately proved to be much more competitive, so much so that Espargaró was able to finish frequently in the top ten. In particular, at Silverstone, after starting from the second row, he finished the race in third position, giving Aprilia their first podium in MotoGP. This was Espargaró's career second podium in MotoGP, after Aragon in 2014, a wait of almost 7 years. His teammate from the Aragon race and on, was Yamaha outcast Maverick Vinales for the rest of the season.

Aprilia Racing (2022–present)
In the third round of the 2022 campaign, Espargaró won the Argentinian GP from pole position, his first win from 200 entries in the premier class, and Aprilia's first MotoGP class win.

On 26 May 2022, Espargaró signed a contract extension with the team for 2023 and 2024, still teaming up with Maverick Viñales.

Career statistics

FIM CEV International Championship

Races by year
(key)

Grand Prix motorcycle racing

By season

By class

Races by year
(key) (Races in bold indicate pole position, races in italics indicate fastest lap)

Personal life

He is a fan of FC Barcelona and its former player Bojan, whom he finally met at the Gran Premi De Catalunya in 2012. He is noted as being a fan of Japanese cuisine, and owns restaurants located in Andorra.

References

External links

1989 births
Living people
Spanish motorcycle racers
Motorcycle racers from Catalonia
125cc World Championship riders
250cc World Championship riders
Suzuki MotoGP riders
Moto2 World Championship riders
Pramac Racing MotoGP riders
Gresini Racing MotoGP riders
Aspar Racing Team MotoGP riders
Sportspeople from Granollers
MotoGP World Championship riders
Aprilia Racing MotoGP riders